Margarita Tschomakova (also Margarita Chomakova, ; born 27 November 1988 in Sofia) is a Bulgarian sabre fencer. Tschomakova is the daughter of Georgi Chomakov, who competed in the same weapon at the 1980 Summer Olympics in Moscow, and at the 1988 Summer Olympics in Seoul.

Tschomakova represented Bulgaria at the 2012 Summer Olympics in London, where she competed as the nation's lone fencer in the women's individual sabre event. Unfortunately, she lost the first preliminary round match to Ukrainian fencer and top medal contender Olga Kharlan, with a final score of 8–15.

Tschomakova is also a member of the fencing team for Ohio State Buckeyes, and a graduate of international business at the Ohio State University in Columbus, Ohio.

References

External links
Profile – FIE
Profile – Ohio State Buckeyes
EuroFencing Profile
NBC Olympics Profile

1988 births
Living people
Bulgarian female sabre fencers
Olympic fencers of Bulgaria
Fencers at the 2012 Summer Olympics
Ohio State Buckeyes fencers
Sportspeople from Sofia